"Love Will Bring Her Around" is a song co-written and recorded by American country music artist Rob Crosby. It was released in October 1990 as the first single from his debut album Solid Ground. The song reached No. 12 on the Billboard Hot Country Singles & Tracks chart.  Crosby wrote this song with Will Robinson.

Chart performance

Year-end charts

References

1990 debut singles
1990 songs
Rob Crosby songs
Songs written by Rob Crosby
Songs written by Will Robinson (songwriter)
Song recordings produced by Scott Hendricks
Arista Nashville singles